Purrr! is the debut extended play (EP) by American singer and rapper Doja Cat. It was released independently on August 5, 2014 by MAU Records and distributed by Kemosabe and RCA Records. Many of the songs were recorded by Doja Cat in a DIY-style using a variety of instrumentals which she found online from producers such as Mndsgn, Evil Needle, and Dream Koala.

Background 
On March 13, 2014, the EP's only single and third track "So High" was officially released on streaming services. This was a repackaged version of the song, as Doja had independently published it on November 8, 2012 via SoundCloud. At the time of Purrr!'s release, "So High" had amassed over 712 thousand streams on SoundCloud and over 240 thousand views on the official music video.

Critical reception 
David Turner of The Fader highlighted the song "Control" as "a breezy seaside joyride built on slow builds and wavy echoes" and also praised Doja Cat's "spacey singing style" throughout the record. Briana Cheng of Dazed wrote that on "No Police", she "fiercely meows" and "sassily" raps and sings over a "mild" guitar riff as part of the "mollifying" beat, notably humming from the police sirens from Lil Wayne's 2008 single "Mrs. Officer". Petar Kujundzic of Hypebeast described Purrr! as "a fine list of bass-heavy, alternative R&B tracks" and highlighted the song "No Police" for "offering the best of her vocal and lyrical abilities". Writing for Illsociety, Kelly Hawkins praised Doja Cat's "brazen raps and airy vocals".

Track listing 

Samples
  "Nunchucks" is built around the musical base of "Legwarmrs", performed by Mndsgn.
  "So High" is built around the musical base of "Falling Leaves", performed by Evil Needle.
  "No Police" is built around the musical base of "We Can't Be Friends", performed by Dream Koala.

References 

Doja Cat albums
Kemosabe Records albums
RCA Records EPs
2014 debut EPs